The Argentine War of Independence was fought from 1810 to 1818 by Argentine patriotic forces under Manuel Belgrano, Juan José Castelli and José de San Martín against royalist forces loyal to the Spanish crown. On July 9, 1816, an assembly met in San Miguel de Tucumán, declared full independence with provisions for a national constitution.

1806
 August 20: The first British invasion of the Río de la Plata is defeated by an army led by Santiago de Liniers. In the absence of the viceroy Rafael de Sobremonte, Liniers is appointed captain general.

1807
 February 10: Rafael de Sobremonte, viceroy of the Viceroyalty of the Río de la Plata, is deposed and replaced by Santiago de Liniers.
 July 7: The second British invasion of the Río de la Plata is defeated.

1808
 Napoleon invades Spain and starts the Peninsular War.
 Mutiny of Aranjuez. A popular uprising forces the King Charles IV to abdicate, being replaced by his son, Ferdinand VII
 Ferdinand VII is removed as king of Spain and replaced by Joseph Bonaparte, appointed by Napoleon.
 Popular resistance creates government Juntas. The Supreme Central and Governing Junta of the Kingdom is created.
 Disputes at the Río de la Plata between Liniers and Francisco Javier de Elío. Elío creates a government Junta in Montevideo.

1809
 January 1: Mutiny of Álzaga, defeated by local militias.
 Liniers is replaced by Baltasar Hidalgo de Cisneros, viceroy designated by the Junta of Seville.
 Mariano Moreno writes The Representation of the Hacendados.
 Cisneros briefly opens the Port of Buenos Aires to foreign trade.

1810
 The government of Spain is defeated by French forces and the Supreme Central and Governing Junta was replaced by the Regency
 The Cortes of Cádiz convenes in Spain
 An open cabildo in Buenos Aires deposes the viceroy and creates a government junta.
 Córdoba rejects the Junta of Buenos Aires. Liniers leads a counter-revolution, which is defeated. Liniers is executed as result.
 Buenos Aires organizes military campaigns against Paraguay and the Upper Peru.

1811
 Francisco Javier de Elío is appointed viceroy by the Juntas of Cádiz, and Montevideo the capital of the Viceroyalty of the Río de la Plata. Elío declares war against the Junta of Buenos Aires, but gets sieged by the surrounding cities.
 Mariano Moreno resigns from the Primera Junta, and dies at sea while traveling to Europe. Nevertheless, disputes between Saavedrist and Morenist groups in Buenos Aires continue.
 Paraguay becomes independent
 The Army of the North is defeated in the Battle of Guaqui. The revolutionaries lost the Upper Peru and their mines.
 The Junta Grande of Buenos Aires is replaced by the First Triumvirate

1812
 Manuel Belgrano creates the Flag of Argentina
 José de San Martín and Carlos María de Alvear arrive in Buenos Aires from Europe
 Martín de Álzaga is executed after a failed mutiny against the First Triumvirate
 Belgrano defeats the royalists at the Battle of Tucumán
 The First Triumvirate is deposed by San Martín and Alvear, and replaced by the Second Triumvirate
 José Gervasio Artigas, José Rondeau and Soler defeat Gaspar de Vigodet

1813
 February 3: José de San Martín defeats a royalist raid from Montevideo during the Battle of San Lorenzo
 Joseph Bonaparte flees from Spain and Ferdinand VII recovers the Spanish crown
 The XIII Year Assembly starts in Buenos Aires. It approves the Canción patriótica by Vicente López y Planes as the Argentine National Anthem
 Patriots are defeated at the Battle of Vilcapugio and the Battle of Ayohuma

1814
 January (exact date disputed): Yatasto relay in Salta. Manuel Belgrano hands the command of the Army of the North to José de San Martín.
 Ferdinand VII returns to Spain. Absolutism is restored; the 1812 Constitution is repealed and the Cortes dissolved.
 José Gervasio Artigas gives up the siege on Montevideo
 The Second Triumvirate is replaced by the Supreme Director, the first one being Gervasio Antonio de Posadas
 Posadas makes Artigas an outlaw because of the creation of the Liga Federal.
 Martín Miguel de Güemes starts the "Guerra Gaucha"
 Montevideo is defeated
 Artigas recovers his titles and the Banda Oriental becomes autonomous
 San Martin is appointed governor of the Cuyo Province
 Posadas resigns

1815
 Carlos María de Alvear is appointed Supreme Director of the United Provinces of the Río de la Plata. He is removed shortly after, and replaced by José Rondeau.
 The Assembly of Year XIII ends its work.
 Artigas creates the Liga de los Pueblos Libres
 Argentineans defeated in the Battle of Viluma

1816
 March 10: A group of royalist scouts is captured during the action of Juncalito.
 Only the region of the Río de la Plata remains under patriotic control.
 The prince Juan raises Brazil to a kingdom and keeps the expansionist policy towards the Rio de la Plata. Their forces invade the Banda Oriental, and Artigas organizes the resistance
 The Congress of Tucumán starts working
 It declares the independence of the United Provinces
 It designates Juan Martín de Pueyrredón as Supreme Director
 The flag created by Manuel Belgrano is chosen to be the Flag of Argentina
 San Martín is appointed head of the Army of the Andes, and Belgrano head of the Army of the North
 July 9, after years of battle on many different grounds the Congress of Tucumán formally declared the independence of the United Provinces of the Río de la Plata from Spain.

1817
 José de San Martín leads the Crossing of the Andes, defeats the Chilean royalists at the Battle of Chacabuco, and triumphantly enters Santiago, Chile
 Brazil completes the invasion of the Banda Oriental
 The Congress of Tucumán moves to Buenos Aires
 Royalists leave Salta and Jujuy, under the pressure of Martín Miguel de Güemes
 Juan Martín de Pueyrredón sends armies to defeat Artigas in the Litoral, but gets defeated by Francisco Ramírez

1820
 Trienio Liberal disband the military Great Expedition against the Rio de la Plata
 José de San Martin leaves Chile with the navy, aiming to defeat the royalists at Peru

1822
 The United States recognizes the independence of the former Spanish colonies
 Bolívar and San Martin meet at Guayaquil
 San Martin fails to defeat the royalists in Peru, resigns from power and leaves Lima

See also
Argentine War of Independence

Bibliography
 

Argentine War of Independence
Argentina history-related lists
Argentine War of Independence
Argentine War of Independence